Emil Bohinen (born 12 March 1999) is a Norwegian professional footballer who plays as central midfielder for Italian  club Salernitana. He is the son of former Norway international midfielder Lars Bohinen.

Club career
Bohinen joined Stabæk youth academy, and made his first team debut for the club in 2017. He made his debut for the first team in the Eliteserien on 17 April 2017 against Sarpsborg 08 FF in a 3-0 win.

After scoring four goals and making eights assists in all competitions during the 2019 season, during November 2019, Bohinen was linked with a move to Premier League side Brighton & Hove Albion.

In December 2019, Stabæk entered talks with Premier League side Sheffield United and EFL Championship side Leeds United about the signing of Bohinen, with Bohinen joining Sheffield United on trial. When asked about being linked to Leeds, Bohinen on 21 January 2020 spoke to Eurosport Norway saying of Leeds' Head Coach Marcelo Bielsa 'He is a coaching legend, so of course it would have been an experience in itself to play for him'.

CSKA Moscow
On 15 February 2021, CSKA Moscow announced the signing of Bohinen from Stabæk on a contract until the end of the 2024–25 season.

Salernitana
On 31 January 2022, he joined Italian club Salernitana on loan with an option to buy and a conditional obligation to buy. The condition for the obligation to buy was fulfilled by Salernitana staying in Serie A, and on 29 June 2022 Bohinen moved to Salernitana on a permanent basis, signing a four-year contract.

International career
Despite being born in Derby, England during his father's spell with Derby County F.C., Bohinen has represented Norway at several age groups up to and including Norway U21.

Bohinen was highly rated as part of the same age group of the new generation of Norwegian footballers alongside the likes of Erling Haaland, Martin Ødegaard, Kristoffer Ajer and Sander Berge.

Style of play
Bohinen plays primarily as a centre midfielder, he has also occasionally played as a winger. He has been described as a skilful player with good technique and good vision. Eurosport also described that 'he also has the X-factor when it comes to his left foot'.

Career statistics

References

1999 births
Living people
Norwegian footballers
Norwegian people of Kven descent
Norway youth international footballers
Norway under-21 international footballers
Association football midfielders
Stabæk Fotball players
PFC CSKA Moscow players
U.S. Salernitana 1919 players
Norwegian Second Division players
Eliteserien players
Russian Premier League players
Serie A players
Norwegian expatriate footballers
Expatriate footballers in Russia
Norwegian expatriate sportspeople in Russia
Expatriate footballers in Italy
Norwegian expatriate sportspeople in Italy